Jan-Hendrik Jagla (born 25 June 1981) is a former German professional basketball player. Though he stands 7 feet tall, Jagla has the game of a 2-guard, and his game somewhat resembles that of Dirk Nowitzki. Jagla was also known to be a point forward in his college days. He is married to Ivana, a daughter of Svetislav Pešić.

Amateur career
He spent three seasons (2001–2004) at the Pennsylvania State University in University Park, Pennsylvania, before turning pro. He finished his Penn State career with 813 points, 504 rebounds and ranks third in school history with 110 blocked shots. Jagla holds the Penn State record for consecutive missed three point shots, 33.   He played one year of high school basketball as an exchange student at Highland High School in Granger Township of Medina, Ohio, where he led the Hornets to their first Suburban League Championship in 1998.

Professional career
He played for Türk Telekom B.K. of the Turkish Basketball League during the 2006–07 season. He played for Joventut Badalona in Spain. Polish champion Asseco Prokom Gdynia signed him on 22 September 2009. In December, 2010 he returned to Türk Telekom B.K. until the end of the 2010–11 season. In July 2011 he returned to Germany by signing with Bayern Munich a two-year contract. In August 2013, he returned after 12 years to his former club Alba Berlin. In August 2014, he signed a one-year deal with Bayern Munich.

On 16 July 2015, he retired from professional basketball.

German national team
Jagla participated in the 2008 Olympics with the German national team.

See also
List of Pennsylvania State University Olympians

References

External links
 Jan Jagla at acb.com
 Jan Jagla at euroleague.net
 Jan Jagla at fiba.com

1981 births
Living people
Alba Berlin players
Asseco Gdynia players
Artland Dragons players
Basketball players at the 2008 Summer Olympics
CB Inca players
FC Bayern Munich basketball players
German expatriate basketball people in Spain
German expatriate basketball people in Turkey
German expatriate basketball people in the United States
German men's basketball players
Joventut Badalona players
Liga ACB players
Olympic basketball players of Germany
Panellinios B.C. players
Penn State Nittany Lions basketball players
Power forwards (basketball)
Basketball players from Berlin
Türk Telekom B.K. players
2010 FIBA World Championship players
2006 FIBA World Championship players